Lucy Galló was a Hungarian figure skater who competed in pair skating.

With partner Rezső Dillinger, in 1935 she won bronze medals at both the World Figure Skating Championships and the European Figure Skating Championships.

Competitive highlights 
With Rezső Dillinger

References 

Hungarian female pair skaters
Date of birth missing
Date of death missing
20th-century Hungarian women